Macello is a comune (municipality) in the Metropolitan City of Turin in the Italian region Piedmont, located about  southwest of Turin.

Macello borders the following municipalities: Pinerolo, Buriasco, Vigone, Garzigliana, and Cavour.

References

Cities and towns in Piedmont